Australian Survivor is an Australian reality game show based on the popular international Survivor format. The Contestants are referred to as "castaways", and they compete against one another to become the "Sole Survivor" and win the grand prize of A$500,000 (or an A$100,000 charity prize in the celebrity season).

The series was first aired on the Nine Network in early 2002. Nine did not renew the series. In 2006, the Seven Network picked up the series to produce a celebrity edition known as Celebrity Survivor. Like its predecessor, Seven did not renew the series. In 2015, Network Ten announced that it would air a new season of Australian Survivor which began airing in August 2016. A fourth season aired in 2017 on Ten.

Two seasons of "Champions vs. Contenders" aired in 2018 and 2019 on Network 10. In 2020, an All Stars season premiered on 3 February 2020, with 24 returning contestants competing for the title of "Sole Survivor" and the cash prize. An eighth season, entitled "Brains V Brawn", aired in late 2021 and a ninth season, entitled "Blood V Water", will air in early 2022.

Over the course of ten seasons, a total of 181 people have participated in the program.

Contestants
All information is accurate as of the time the season was filmed, and thus may vary from season to season for returning players.

References

 
Survivor (franchise) contestants
Australian Survivor contestants
Australian Survivor contestants
Australian Survivor contestants
Contestants